Maple Grove Township may refer to the following places in the United States:

 Maple Grove Township, Barry County, Michigan
 Maple Grove Township, Cheboygan County, Michigan (defunct)
 Maple Grove Township, Manistee County, Michigan
 Maple Grove Township, Saginaw County, Michigan
 Maple Grove Township, Becker County, Minnesota
 Maple Grove Township, Crow Wing County, Minnesota

Township name disambiguation pages